Deokdu Station is a station of the BGLRT Line of Busan Metro in Daejeo-dong, Gangseo District, Busan, South Korea.

Station Layout

Vicinity
Exit 1: Bogwangsa
Exit 2: Busan Gangseo Police Station Airport Police Box

External links
  Cyber station information from Busan Transportation Corporation

Busan Metro stations
Busan–Gimhae Light Rail Transit
Gangseo District, Busan
Railway stations opened in 2011